This is a timeline documenting events of Jazz in the year 1995.

Events

April
 7 – The 22nd Vossajazz started in Voss, Norway (April 7 – 9).

May
 23 – The 23rd Nattjazz started in Bergen, Norway (May 23 – June 4).

June
 2 – The 24th Moers Festival started in Moers, Germany (June 2 – 5).
 29 – The 16th Montreal International Jazz Festival started in Canada (June 29 – July 9).

July
 1 – The 5th Jazz Fest Wien started in Wien, Austria (July 1 – 12).
 7 – The 29th Montreux Jazz Festival started in Switzerland (July 7 – 22).
 14 – The 20th North Sea Jazz Festival started in The Hague, Netherlands (July 14 – 16).
 15 – The 30th Pori Jazz Festival started in Finland (July 15 – 23).
 17 – The 36th Moldejazz started in Molde, Norway (July 17 – 22).
 The 48th Nice Jazz Festival started in France (July 7 – 16).
 21 – The 30th San Sebastian Jazz Festival started in San Sebastian, Spain (July 21 – 25).

August
 11 – The 12th Brecon Jazz Festival started in Brecon, Wales (August 11 – 13).

September
 15 – The 38th Monterey Jazz Festival started in Monterey, California (September 15 – 17).

Unknown date
 The Thelonious Monk Institute of Jazz opens their first performance classes of jazz.

Album releases

Butch Morris: Testament
Dave Douglas: In Our Lifetime
Matthew Shipp: The Flow of X
Charlie Hunter: Bing, Bing, Bing!
Marvin Peterson: African Portraits
Guy Klucevsek: Citrus My Love
Marty Ehrlich: Just Before The Dawn
Matthew Shipp: Symbol Systems
Gerry Hemingway: Marmalade King
Steve Turre: Rhythm Within
Medeski Martin and Wood: Friday Afternoon in the Universe
Reggie Workman: Cerebral Caverns
Muhal Richard Abrams: One Line, Two Views
Dave Douglas: Five   
Bill Frisell: Go West
Pat Metheny Group: We Live Here
Henry Threadgill: Makin' a Move
Dave Holland: Dream of the Elders
Paul Plimley: Everything in Stage
John Scofield: Groove Elation
Chick Corea Quartet: Time Warp
Matthew Shipp: Before the World
Don Byron: Music for Six Musicians
Uri Caine: Toys
Michael Franks: Abandoned Garden
Roy Campbell:Communion
Marilyn Crispell: Destiny
David S. Ware: Cryptology
Stanley Clarke, Al Di Meola, Jean-Luc Ponty: The Rite of Strings

Deaths 

 January
 1 – Jess Stacy, American pianist (born 1904).

 February
 6 – Art Taylor, American drummer (born 1929).

 March
 5 – Vivian Stanshall, English singer-songwriter, musician, author, poet, and wit, Bonzo Dog Doo-Dah Band (born 1943).
 30 – Rozelle Claxton, American pianist (born 1913).
 31 – Max Brüel, Danish pianist and saxophonist (born 1927).

 April
 2 – Julius Hemphill, American composer and saxophonist (born 1938).

 May
 7 – Ray McKinley, American drummer, singer, and bandleader (born 1910).
 9 – Marshall Royal, American clarinetist and alto saxophonist (born 1912).
 10
 Jimmy Raney, American guitarist (born 1927).
 Karl Drewo, Austrian saxophonist (born 1929).
 15 – Minoru Matsuya, Japanese pianist (born 1910).
 23 – Mick Pyne, English pianist (born 1940).

 June
 4 – Earle Warren, American alto saxophonist and singer (born 1914).
 5 – Bucky Calabrese, American upright bassist (born 1927).
 30 – Phyllis Hyman, American singer and actress (born 1949).

 July
 13 – Aimé Barelli, French trumpeter, vocalist, and band leader (born 1917).
 22 – Percy Humphrey, American trumpeter and bandleader (born 1905).

 August
 11 – Phil Harris, American comedian, actor, singer, and musician (born 1904).
 20 – John Gilmore, American saxophonist (born 1931).

 September
 12 – Larry Gales, American upright bassist (born 1936).

 October
 19 – Don Cherry, American trumpeter (born 1936).

 November
 19 – Don Goldie, American trumpeter (born 1930).

 December
 30 – Ralph Flanagan, American pianist, composer, and arranger (born 1914).

 Unknown date
 Jacques Denjean, French composer and arranger, Les Double Six (born 1929).
 Roger Chaput, French guitarist and visual artist, Quintette du Hot Club de France (born 1909).

Births 

 April
 21 – Alma Macbride, American pianist, composer, and film maker.

 May
 9 – Andrea Motis, Spanish singer and trumpeter.

 Unknown date
 9 – Selma French Bolstad, Norwegian singer, fiddler, and composer.

See also

 1990s in jazz
 List of years in jazz
 1995 in music

References

External links 
 History Of Jazz Timeline: 1995 at All About Jazz

Jazz
Jazz by year